Peter Gervaise Joseph Eyre (born 11 March 1942) is an American-born English actor.

Eyre was born in New York City, the son of Dorothy Pelline (née Acton) and Edward Joseph Eyre, a banker. He was sent to a public school in England at the age of 12, and has been based in the country ever since.

Although offered a place at the Royal Academy of Dramatic Art at the age of 18, he studied acting in Paris. His career in the theatre includes work with the Old Vic (his professional debut), the Royal Shakespeare Company, the Royal National Theatre, and The Old Vic Theatre Company under the direction of Kevin Spacey.

Filmography

Having a Wild Weekend (1965) - Art Director (uncredited)
Julius Caesar (1970) - Cinna the Poet
The Rivals of Sherlock Holmes (1971, TV Series) - George Fitzwilliam
The Pied Piper (1972, by Jacques Demy) - Priest
Mahler (1974, by Ken Russell) - Otto Mahler
Hedda (1975) - Jørgen Tesman
Luna (1979, by Bernardo Bertolucci) - Edward
Dragonslayer (1981) - Casiodorus Rex
Maurice (1987, by James Ivory) - Rev. Borenius
Just Ask for Diamond (1988) - Gott
Mountains of the Moon (1990) - Norton Shaw
Let Him Have It (1991) - Humphreys
Orlando (1992) - Pope
The Remains of the Day (1993, by James Ivory) - Lord Halifax
Princess Caraboo (1994) - Lord Apthorpe
Surviving Picasso (1996, by James Ivory) - Sabartes
The Tango Lesson (1997, by Sally Potter) - English Tango Fan
Dangerous Beauty (1998) - The Doge
Merlin (1998, TV Mini-Series) - Chief Physician
Friends (1998, TV Series) - the registrar
Midsomer Murders (1999, TV Series) - Leonard Pike (in S2:E2 “Strangler’s Wood”)
Alice in Wonderland (1999, TV Movie) - Frogface Footman
The Golden Bowl (2000, by James Ivory) - A.R. Jarvis, Shopkeeper
From Hell (2001) - Lord Hallsham
The Affair of the Necklace (2001) - Monsieur Bassenge
The Situation (2006) - U.S. Ambassador
Shadows in the Sun (2009) - Jonathan / 'Prospero'

References

External links

1942 births
Living people
20th-century American male actors
20th-century English male actors
21st-century American male actors
21st-century English male actors
American emigrants to England
American male film actors
American male television actors
English male film actors
English male television actors
Male actors from New York City